Casper von Folsach (born 30 March 1993) is a Danish road and track cyclist, who last rode for UCI Continental team . At the 2012 Summer Olympics, he competed in the Men's team pursuit for the national team.

Major results

2011
 1st  Time trial, National Junior Road Championships
 6th Time trial, UCI Junior Road World Championships
 9th Overall Grand Prix Rüebliland
2013
 2nd Time trial, National Under-23 Road Championships
 3rd Road race, National Road Championships
2017
 1st Stage 5 Okolo Jižních Čech
 4th Kalmar Grand Prix
2018
 1st Ronde van Midden-Nederland
 2nd Gylne Gutuer
 2nd Duo Normand (with Emil Vinjebo)
 5th Hafjell GP
 10th Omloop Mandel-Leie-Schelde

References

External links

1993 births
Living people
Danish male cyclists
Olympic cyclists of Denmark
Cyclists at the 2012 Summer Olympics
Cyclists at the 2016 Summer Olympics
Danish track cyclists
People from Gentofte Municipality
Olympic bronze medalists for Denmark
Olympic medalists in cycling
Medalists at the 2016 Summer Olympics
Sportspeople from the Capital Region of Denmark